D&D Beyond (DDB) is the official digital toolset and game companion for Dungeons & Dragons fifth edition. DDB hosts online versions of the official Dungeons & Dragons fifth edition books, including rulebooks, adventures, and other supplements; it also provides digital tools like a character builder and digital character sheet, monster and spell listings that can be sorted and filtered, an encounter builder, and an interactive overlay Twitch Extension. In addition to the official D&D content available to purchase, it also provides the ability to create and add custom homebrew content.

D&D Beyond also publishes regular original video, stream, and article content, including interviews with Dungeons & Dragons staff, content previews and tie-ins, and weekly development updates.

D&D Beyond was formerly operated by Curse LLC, a subsidiary of Twitch. However, on December 12, 2018, Fandom, Inc. announced that it had acquired all of Curse's media assets, including D&D Beyond. On April 13, 2022, Hasbro announced that it would be acquiring D&D Beyond. The official transfer to Wizards of the Coast, a division of Hasbro, occurred on May 18, 2022.

History 
D&D Beyond was launched on August 15, 2017, after an initial beta test that started on March 21, 2017. Adam Bradford was the project lead for D&D Beyond.

Acquisition by Fandom 
On December 12, 2018, Fandom, Inc. announced that it had acquired all of Curse LLC's media assets, including D&D Beyond, for an undisclosed amount.

In June 2019, D&D Beyond added an Encounter Builder tool set which was open to subscribers for alpha testing. Encounter Builder entered public beta testing in October 2019.

In February 2020, D&D Beyond added a Combat Tracker which was open to subscribers for alpha testing.

On March 25, 2020, Bradford, now Vice President of Tabletop Gaming at Fandom, told Syfy Wire that D&D Beyond's normal number of new users had doubled in the past two weeks during the COVID-19 pandemic and that there was also a "a similar increase in the number of active users". In April 2020, The Wall Street Journal reported that "Bradford said the number of registered users has tripled in the past month, and the number of online players at any one time has doubled on average. The uptake has forced the company to accelerate the expansion of its infrastructure, which otherwise would have taken place months from now".

In January 2021, James Haeck, lead writer for D&D Beyond, announced his departure from the company. In February 2021, Bradford, Todd Kenreck (creative manager at D&D Beyond & Fandom), and Laura Urban (community manager for D&D Beyond) all announced their departure from Fandom for other projects.

Acquisition by Hasbro 
On April 13, 2022, Hasbro announced its acquisition of D&D Beyond for $146.3 million, with plans to officially support previous purchases made on the service and have it be absorbed into Hasbro's Wizards of the Coast. The sale is subject to closing conditions and certain regulatory approvals, and is set to be completed in either Q2 or Q3 of 2022. Polygon highlighted that Wizards of the Coast is a large portion of "Hasbro's overall earnings since the launch of 5th edition D&D in 2014. With an operating profit of $547 million in 2021, Wizards' business unit accounted for 72% of Hasbro's operating profit for the year. Taking that into perspective, the purchase of D&D Beyond from Fandom for $146.3 million in cash seems like a small price to pay in order to lock down a platform with reportedly close to 10 million users". Gizmodo commented that once D&D Beyond is an official part of Wizards of the Coast, "they might offer some kind of cross capability with digital products across multiple sites, toolkits, and VTTs, making the capital barriers to gameplay less excruciating. [...] But also the uniform consolidation of digital tools under a single company's banner is not good for competition and therefore, causes the player to have fewer options for gameplay. [...] If fans still have to pay two or three times for a module, class, or item description across both WotC products and DnDBeyond, it's unlikely to create a sustainable market".

D&D Beyond accounts transferred to Wizards of the Coast on May 18, 2022. At that time, Wizards of the Coast's updated terms of service and privacy policy went into effect. To mark the acquisition, Wizards of the Coast gave registered D&D Beyond users the Acquisitions Incorporated (2019) supplement between May 16 and May 26, 2022. Additionally, they made a starter adventure module, Lost Mine of Phandelver (2014), available to all registered users moving forward. Then in April and June, Wizards of the Coast released two new D&D Beyond exclusive supplements – the Monstrous Compendium Vol 1: Spelljammer Creatures (2022) and the Vecna Dossier (2022) respectively.

Between November and December 2022, there was reported speculation that Wizards was planning on discontinuing the Open Game License (OGL) for Dungeons & Dragons based on unconfirmed leaks. The OGL has allowed a wide range of unofficial commercial derivative work based on the mechanics of Dungeons and Dragons to be produced since 2000; it is credited with increasing the market share of d20 products and leading to a "boom in the RPG industry". Linda Codega, for Io9 on January 5, 2023, reported on the details from a leaked full copy of the OGL 1.1 including updated terms such as no longer authorizing use of the OGL1.0. In the days following this leak, IGN, Vice, The Guardian, Financial Times CNBC, and many other industry focused outlets reported on negative reactions from both fans and professional content creators. One response from the community was an online movement to cancel subscriptions to D&D Beyond; ComicBook.com reported that this boycott movement coalesced on social media around the "#StoptheSub hashtag [...] with many prominent D&D personalities encouraging their followers to join the grassroots campaign". Game Rant highlighted that the movement was also using "DnDBegone" which, along with "StopTheSub", "joined OpenDnD as trending on Twitter as players disparaged Wizards of the Coast and parent company Hasbro over its draconian policies". The Financial Times commented that "unsubscribing from D&D Beyond seems to be go-to way of showing discontent". Io9 reported that per their sources at Wizards "the result of these cancellations and their impact on the bottom line of Wizards of the Coast is not negligible" and led to scrambling by upper management "to adjust their messaging around the situation".

Following the leak, Wizards walked back changes to the OGL. The Motley Fool highlighted that "Hasbro pulled an abrupt volte-face and had its subsidiary D&D Beyond publish a mea culpa on its website". TheStreet commented that Wizards united its "entire player base" behind the movement "to restore the game's original open gaming license" with players responding "with their wallets"; "subscription service D&D Beyond saw players canceling subscriptions en masse – enough to allegedly cause the website to crash". Io9 also highlighted that the movement to boycott D&D Beyond "sent a message to WotC and Hasbro higher-ups. According to multiple sources, these immediate financial consequences were the main thing that forced them to respond"; per sources, there were "'five digits' worth of complaining tickets in the system" for customer service to handle account deletion requests. Following this response, there was reported speculation on changes to D&D Beyond based on new unconfirmed leaks; this included a major overhaul to D&D Beyond spearheaded by Wizards of the Coast digital game vice president Chris Cao. ComicBook.com, in its Character Sheet YouTube show, commented that while "several trusted tabletop RPG sources" have confirmed the leaks, ComicBook.com has not been able to independently confirm the veracity of the leak. In response, D&D Beyond stated this was "misinformation" – they refuted rumors of a price increase and that an artificial intelligence Dungeon Master would be introduced to the platform.

Content 

Books on D&D Beyond consist of the compendium content and access to that content's options in the rest of the toolset. The compendium content is a digital version of the book (as HTML, not a PDF), with all art and maps from the book as well; it includes cross-links and tooltips for monsters, mundane or magical items, spells, and relevant rules mentioned in the text. Access to the book's options in the rest of DDB's toolset allows those purchased subclasses, spells, magic items, monsters, and the like to be used with the character builder and other tools, and allows the user to see the full descriptions of purchased content in those listings (i.e., outside the compendium).

Official Dungeons & Dragons fifth edition sourcebooks released by Wizards of the Coast are available for purchase on D&D Beyond. Official content that is released for free by Wizards of the Coast is also accessible for free on D&D Beyond. This includes content from the basic rules and the System Reference Document (the "basic rules" on D&D Beyond are an inclusive combination of the two), the races and spells from the Elemental Evil Player's Companion, and active playtest content presented in the Unearthed Arcana series on the official Dungeons & Dragons website (starting in January 2018). For this final category, Unearthed Arcana content is generally added to D&D Beyond approximately one week after it is released by Wizards of the Coast. Once the playtest period has concluded for Unearthed Arcana content (whether it is published in a book or retired, as determined by Wizards of the Coast), it is archived on D&D Beyond; existing characters already using the content are able to continue doing so, but the archived playtest content can not be newly added to a character.

On May 10, 2022, it was announced that the digital release of Mordenkainen Presents: Monsters of the Multiverse (2022) will correspond with the delisting of Volo's Guide to Monsters (2016) and Mordenkainen's Tome of Foes (2018) on D&D Beyond as Monsters of the Multiverse revises the player races and monsters previously published in those sourcebooks. D&D Beyond then confirmed that users will retain access to previously purchased copies of Volo's Guide to Monsters and Mordenkainen's Tome of Foes. D&D Beyond also stated that they "may update naming conventions of content to easily differentiate our listings" for users who have purchased access to both old and new content.

Digital releases 
Wizards of the Coast has also released some content exclusively on D&D Beyond:

Toolsets 
Unlocked compendium content can be accessed in various toolsets such as interactive character sheets and catalogs of spells, monsters and items. In 2020, D&D Beyond added a digital dice roller to character sheets with both free and premium digital dice. Dungeon Masters can create campaigns on D&D Beyond where players can add their character sheets. In 2020, D&D Beyond launched the "Encounter Builder" tool for Dungeon Masters to design and run combat encounters for their players.

Additionally, D&D Beyond includes a homebrew creation tool which allows users to create and share homebrew versions of "spells, magical items, monsters, backgrounds, feats, races or subclasses".

Platforms 

D&D Beyond content and character management system is primarily browser-based, and is fully functional on both mobile and desktop browsers. DDB's website is continually updated, based largely on input from users throughout the community.

On March 4, 2018, D&D Beyond's mobile app was first released into beta testing, focused on providing an e-reader for official Dungeons & Dragons content. The app allows compendium content for Dungeons & Dragons to be downloaded for offline use. Some users had criticized the app's lack of a character sheet or builder, which was one of the main offerings of D&D Beyond; however, DDB disclosed that character management functionality was planned.

In a D&D Beyond development update stream on October 31, 2019, Adam Bradford discussed DDB's plans to develop two additional mobile apps focused on the player experience and the Dungeon Master experience respectively; he explained that character management functionality would be included in this new player app, leaving the existing mobile app as a reader for compendium content. In March 2020, D&D Beyond opened up limited alpha testing for this player app to those current subscribers who signed up, and the alpha test began the following month.

Pricing 
D&D Beyond derives its income from digital content purchases, subscriptions, and advertising. Its tools are generally free to use, though some require an account (which can be made for free); however, viewing the full details of content from the official Dungeons & Dragons fifth edition books requires owning that content on D&D Beyond or having it shared with you. This content can be bought as a one-time purchase; buying a subscription does not grant access to any content. The Verge highlighted that the acquisition by Hasbro "shifts D&D Beyond from a royalty-based revenue source for Wizards of the Coast to in-house development".

Content purchases 
In DDB's Marketplace, customers can either purchase a book as a whole – including both compendium content and access to that content in the rest of the toolset – or purchase individual portions of that book separately (getting just the compendium content, or just the individual spells or subclasses that they want to use in the character builder, for instance). If portions of a book are purchased à la carte, then if the customer decides to purchase the full book later, the price of that book is discounted by the cost they have already paid for content from the book. At launch, the price of source books was $29.99 and the price of adventure modules was $24.99.

D&D Beyond also offers 3 bundles of books: the Sourcebook Bundle, the Adventure Bundle, and the Legendary Bundle. The Sourcebook Bundle includes all released official source books for Dungeons & Dragons fifth edition, and grants a permanent 10% discount on all future sourcebook purchases on DDB; the Adventure Bundle does the same for official adventure books. The Legendary Bundle includes all released official Dungeons & Dragons fifth edition books of both kinds, and grants a 15% discount on all future source book and adventure purchases. At launch, the Legendary Bundle (which included five source books and eight adventure modules) was $279.99. By March 2020, the Legendary Bundle cost had increased to $637.19 and included access to "more than 30 titles in all". This was later changed to US$955.86 and now includes 44 books. The price of each bundle is determined by simply adding the current price of all books in the bundle, then subtracting the cost the customer has previously paid for books in that bundle that they already own. These bundles are updated with each new official release.

Subscriptions 
Most of D&D Beyond's functionality is free to use, other than the content purchases needed to view non-free content from the official Dungeons & Dragons fifth edition books. However, D&D Beyond offers two subscription levels, Hero Tier and Master Tier, that expand the site's functionality.

The Hero Tier subscription grants a number of benefits. The site normally features ads, and the character builder limits free users to 6 active characters at any given time. However, the Hero Tier subscription removes ads, and allows users to create an unlimited number of characters. In addition, while homebrew content that users choose to publish on the site is free to view for anyone (even without an account), the Hero Tier subscription allows users to add published homebrew content to their collection; this content can then be used in the rest of the toolset, including the character builder. Finally, this tier grants early access to some new tools as they are developed. For instance, before it was made available to everyone, the encounter builder went through an alpha testing phase, during which Hero and Master Tier subscribers could make use of it and provide feedback to help identify bugs and guide future development.

The Master Tier subscription primarily allows the user to share their purchased content with others in a campaign group with them on D&D Beyond, in addition to all the benefits of the Hero Tier subscription. Though private homebrew content is automatically shared without a subscription, published homebrew content and official content requires a Master Tier subscription to be shared. With a Master Tier subscription, the user can enable content sharing for up to 3 campaigns they are in of up to 12 players each (as well as the Dungeon Master of each campaign). If content sharing is enabled, any official content owned by any of the players or the Dungeon Master (DM), as well as any published homebrew content in any of their collections, is shared with the other members of the group. , the DM of a campaign group can enable or disable the sharing of compendium content from each specific book with players that do not own that content; more specific shared content management options are planned for the future.

Reception 
Gus Wezerek, for FiveThirtyEight, reported that of the 5th edition class and race combinations per 100,000 characters that players created on D&D Beyond from August 15 to September 15, 2017, fighters were the most popular with 13,906 characters created, followed by rogues (11,307) and wizards (9,855). Druids were the least popular, with 6,328 characters created. Wezerek wrote: "when I started playing 'Dungeons & Dragons' five years ago, I never would have chosen the game’s most popular match: the human fighter. There are already enough human fighters in movies, TV and books — my first character was an albino dragonborn sorcerer. But these days I can get behind the combo’s simplicity".

Cecilia D'Anastasio, for Kotaku in 2017, wrote "when viewed as a toolset and not a replacement for D&D’s traditions, D&D Beyond is exactly the sort of digital facelift the game needs to stay accessible, streamlined and relevant". D'Anastasio highlighted one downside, which was that content from the DMs Guild is not automatically integrated with D&D Beyond. Gavin Sheehan, for Bleeding Cool in 2017, highlighted the ability to make homebrew content in D&D Beyond. While Sheehan believed the digital resources were worth the cost, he wrote that "the pricing will be the real dividing point for some people. [...] I can see people screaming that they don't get to own the material like you would a book".

Alex Walker, for Kotaku Australia in 2019, reported that two years after launch the D&D Beyond mobile app would be updated to include the ability to load character sheets. Walker highlighted that this was a highly requested feature from the launch of D&D Beyond; Walker criticized the delay in adding the feature especially as other versions of mobile character sheets had been done before effectively.

Charlie Hall, for Polygon, reported that in March 2020 the cost of D&D Beyond's Legendary Bundle was $637.19. He highlighted that the cost of the digital Dungeons & Dragons source books and adventure modules are about the same as the physical books, and that "many players are still defaulting to physical books". Hall viewed D&D Beyond as a luxury app and that he is "not eager to effectively buy the same content twice". Adam Benjamin, for CNET in February 2023, wrote that "a Hero tier subscription isn't great value unless you play in a lot of D&D groups (more than six). The real value of a subscription is sharing content with the Master Tier. [...] A DM with a Master-tier subscription can spend $6 per month and share purchased content with the rest of the group even if they have free accounts". Benjamin commented that "the primary drawback of D&D Beyond is that it focuses on character sheets, not other elements of a D&D table" – for groups dependent on maps to "visualize combat and exploration", they'll need to use a virtual tabletop (such as Roll20 or Fantasy Grounds) or other map tools in addition to D&D Beyond.

On the May 2022 announcement of sourcebook delisting, Christian Hoffer, for ComicBook.com, commented that "one major concern about the delisting is access to the chapters of lores contained in Volo's Guide to Monsters and Mordenkainen's Tome of Foes. Both books contained dozens of pages of lore about the D&D multiverse that don't appear in Monsters of the Multiverse. [...] D&D Beyond has not said whether the various expanded lore chapters will be available to D&D Beyond players moving forward, or if they'll be delisted and essentially removed from access by new players moving forward. Of course, D&D players can still read the lore in Volo's Guide to Monsters and Mordenkainen's Tome of Foes by purchasing physical copies of the books, which will still be available even after Monsters of the Multiverse is released next week".

See also 

 D&D Insider

References

External links 
 

2017 establishments in California
2022 mergers and acquisitions
Dungeons & Dragons
Free-content websites
Internet properties established in 2017
Mobile content
Role-playing game software
Role-playing game websites
Wizards of the Coast